The 2020–21 NCAA football bowl games were a series of post-season games scheduled to complete the 2020 NCAA Division I FBS football season. The games began on December 21, 2020, continued with the 2021 College Football Playoff National Championship played on January 11, 2021, and concluded with the 2021 Hula Bowl, played on January 31, 2021.

The number of bowl games was lower than in recent seasons (25 team-competitive bowls aside from the National Championship Game, and 2 All-Star games), as both the regular season and postseason were impacted by the COVID-19 pandemic. In mid-October 2020, the NCAA waived bowl eligibility requirements for the 2020–21 bowl season, intended "to allow as many student-athletes as possible the opportunity to participate in bowl games this year." This led to nine teams with losing records accepting bids to bowl games, surpassing the six teams with losing records who were deemed bowl eligible (rules not waived) in order to fill the 2016–17 NCAA football bowl gamesconsistent with the ongoing proliferation of what used to be a limited number of bowl games intended to reward the best teams in college football.

Schedule
The schedule for the 2020–21 bowl games is below. All times are EST (UTC−5). Note that Division II bowls and Division III bowls are not included here.

On October 23, 2020, the Football Bowl Association announced a rebranding as "Bowl Season"; the organization works "with all existing bowls to promote the benefits of the entire bowl system." The organization's logo was visible on the field at some bowl games.

College Football Playoff and Championship Game
The College Football Playoff (CFP) system is used to determine a national championship of Division I FBS college football. A 13-member committee of experts ranked the top 25 teams in the nation after each of the final five weeks of the regular season. On August 5, 2020, CFP organizers announced that they would move the release of final rankings and semifinal matchups from December 6 to 20, in order to accommodate conferences that had delayed their championship games to mid-December. The top four teams in the final ranking were seeded in a single-elimination semifinal round, with the winners advancing to the National Championship game.

The semifinal games for the 2020–21 season were the Rose Bowl and the Sugar Bowl. Both were played on January 1, 2021, as part of a yearly rotation of three pairs of six bowls, commonly referred to as the New Year's Six bowl games. The Rose Bowl game was relocated to AT&T Stadium in Arlington, Texas, home of the Cotton Bowl Classic, after Governor Gavin Newsom's orders in response to the COVID-19 pandemic in California would have resulted in the game being played behind closed doors without fans. The semifinal winners advanced to the 2021 College Football Playoff National Championship at Hard Rock Stadium in Miami Gardens, Florida, played on January 11, 2021.

In the event of COVID-19 issues within the playoff teams, CFP organizers had identified contingency dates (which did not need to be used) of January 11 and January 12 for the semifinals and January 18 for the championship game.

Each of the games in the following table was televised by ESPN.

Source:

Non-CFP bowl games
Due to a sponsorship change, what had been the Camping World Bowl played in Florida was renamed the Cheez-It Bowl, and the former Cheez-It Bowl played in Arizona became the Guaranteed Rate Bowl. Also due to a sponsorship change, what had been the Belk Bowl was renamed as the Duke's Mayo Bowl. Due to the COVID-19 pandemic, the 2020 edition of the New Mexico Bowl was moved to Frisco, Texas.

New bowls
Three new bowls had planned to debut during the 2020–21 bowl season, although only one was actually played.
 The Fenway Bowl (Boston, Massachusetts) was postponed to the 2021–22 bowl season due to the pandemic.
 The LA Bowl (Inglewood, California) was initially scheduled for December 30, then postponed to the 2021–22 bowl season due to the pandemic. 
 The Myrtle Beach Bowl (Conway, South Carolina) was played on December 21.

The Montgomery Bowl was announced as a "substitute of the Fenway Bowl for this season only".

Cancelled bowls
The following annual bowl games had their 2020 editions canceled (date announced):
 Redbox Bowl (July 31): Although the COVID-19 pandemic was cited as a justification, Levi's Stadium not renewing its agreement to host the game was an additional factor, making the overall future of the bowl unclear.
 Bahamas Bowl and Hawaii Bowl (October 2): Canceled due to travel restrictions related to the pandemic.
 Holiday Bowl (October 22): Organizers cited complications from the pandemic and the demolition of its former home venue, SDCCU Stadium.
 Quick Lane Bowl (October 30): No specific reason was given for the cancellation.
 Pinstripe Bowl (November 27): Canceled due to an increase in COVID-19 cases.
 Sun Bowl (December 1): Canceled due to an increase in COVID-19 cases.
 Las Vegas Bowl (December 2): Canceled due to COVID-19 complications. On December 3, it was announced that the game's new Pac-12 and SEC tie-ins would be transferred to the Armed Forces Bowl (although only an SEC tie-in would be fulfilled, with The American providing an opponent).
 Frisco Bowl (December 15): Canceled due to COVID-19 complications within the SMU program. As a result, UTSA accepted a bid to the First Responder Bowl.
 Independence Bowl, Birmingham Bowl and Guaranteed Rate Bowl (December 20): Canceled due to a lack of available teams to play.
 Military Bowl (December 21): Canceled due to a lack of available teams to play.
 Gasparilla Bowl (December 22): Cancelled after South Carolina dropped out due to COVID issues, leaving UAB with no opponent.
 Music City Bowl (December 27): Cancelled after Missouri dropped out due to COVID issues, leaving Iowa with no opponent.
 Texas Bowl (December 29): Cancelled after TCU dropped out due to COVID issues, leaving Arkansas with no opponent.

On December 14, the NCAA's Football Oversight Committee (FOC) announced that FBS teams would be allowed to schedule an additional game in the event of a bowl game cancellation. Such games would need to be requested not later than December 21, and played not later than December 31. A replacement game would need to be scheduled against an opponent from a conference with a tie-in to the canceled bowl game.

The cancellations, along with the move of the Cure Bowl from CBS Sports Network to ESPN due to its acquisition by ESPN Events, left the Arizona Bowl as the only bowl not televised by the ESPN family of networks. On December 10, it was announced that the Arizona Bowl would be shifted from CBS Sports Network to the main CBS network as a substitute for the Sun Bowl.

Bowls played

Source:

FCS bowl game
The Celebration Bowl, held between the champions of the FCS Mid-Eastern Athletic Conference (MEAC) and Southwestern Athletic Conference (SWAC) was canceled, due to both conferences having postponed football to spring 2021 due to COVID-19.

The NCAA has likewise delayed the Division I FCS tournament to April 2021, with the 2021 NCAA Division I Football Championship Game scheduled to occur in May 2021.

All-star games
The East–West Shrine Bowl and NFLPA Collegiate Bowl were canceled due to COVID-19 concerns.

Team selections
In mid-October, the NCAA waived its usual bowl eligibility requirements. In early November, the Pac-12 Conference announced that its teams would need to have at least a .500 record to be considered for a bowl game. Additionally, the Mid-American Conference (MAC) only allowed their top two teams to go to bowl games.

Programs removed from bowl consideration
Multiple programs opted out of, or were otherwise removed from, bowl consideration in advance of final CFP standings and bowl announcements on December 20. Each program is listed with its win–loss record and the date its removal was announced.

 Middle Tennessee Blue Raiders (3–6), December 5 — ended season.
 LSU Tigers (5–5), December 9 — opted out of bowl consideration as part of a self-imposed one-year postseason ban over Level III sanctions involving former LSU wide receiver Odell Beckham Jr.
 Boston College Eagles (6–5), December 10 — opted out.
 Pittsburgh Panthers (6–5), December 11 — opted out.
 Virginia Cavaliers (5–5), December 13 — opted out.
 Stanford Cardinal (4–2), December 13 — opted out.
 Georgia Tech Yellow Jackets (3–7), December 14 — opted out.
 SMU Mustangs (7–3), December 15 — originally selected to play in the Frisco Bowl, but withdrew due to pandemic concerns within the team, leading to the bowl's cancellation.
 Kansas State Wildcats (4–6), December 16 — opted out.
 Virginia Tech Hokies (5–6), December 16 — opted out. The program had appeared in 27 consecutive bowl games, dating back to the 1993 Independence Bowl. At the time of opting out, this was the longest active bowl appearance streak, and the fourth-longest in college football history.
 Louisville Cardinals (4–7), December 16 — advised by the ACC that "we're not in line for a bowl".
 San Diego State Aztecs (4–4), December 16 — opted out.
 UCLA Bruins (3–4), December 17 — opted out.
 Utah Utes (3–2), December 18 — opted out.
 Washington Huskies (3–1), December 18 — opted out. The Huskies also had to give up their spot in the 2020 Pac-12 Football Championship Game, due to having an insufficient number of players available.
 USC Trojans (5–1), December 19 — opted out.
 Penn State Nittany Lions (4–5), December 19 — opted out.
 Minnesota Golden Gophers (3–4), December 20 — opted out.
 Nebraska Cornhuskers (3–5), December 20 — opted out.
 Michigan State Spartans (2–5), December 20 — opted out.
 Arizona State Sun Devils (2–2), December 20 — opted out.
 Maryland Terrapins (2–3), December 20 — opted out.
 Boise State Broncos (5–2), December 20 — opted out. The program had appeared in 18 consecutive bowl games, dating back to the 2002 Humanitarian Bowl.

The following programs dropped out of their respective bowl games after the pairings were set:
 Tennessee Volunteers (3–7), December 21 — accepted a bid to the Liberty Bowl, but dropped out the next day due to a rise in positive COVID cases within the program. Tennessee was replaced by Army (9–2) in the Liberty Bowl.
 South Carolina Gamecocks (2–8), December 22 — accepted a bid to the Gasparilla Bowl, but dropped out two days later due to a rise in COVID cases.
 Missouri Tigers (5–5), December 27 — accepted a bid to the Music City Bowl but dropped out due to a rise in COVID cases.
 TCU Horned Frogs (6–4), December 29 — accepted a bid to the Texas Bowl but dropped out due to a rise in COVID cases.

Bowl teams with losing records
Nine teams with losing records received bowl invitations, the first such occurrences since the 2016 season:

 Arkansas Razorbacks (3–7) to the Texas Bowl — cancelled due to a rise of COVID cases within the TCU program.
 Houston Cougars (3–4) to the New Mexico Bowl
 Kentucky Wildcats (4–6) to the Gator Bowl
 Mississippi State Bulldogs (3–7) to the Armed Forces Bowl
 North Texas Mean Green (4–5) to the Myrtle Beach Bowl
 Ole Miss Rebels (4–5) to the Outback Bowl
 South Carolina Gamecocks (2–8) to the Gasparilla Bowl — subsequently withdrew
 Tennessee Volunteers (3–7) to the Liberty Bowl — subsequently withdrew
 Western Kentucky Hilltoppers (5–6) to the LendingTree Bowl

Six of the nine teams played their bowls, recording three wins (Kentucky, Mississippi State, and Ole Miss) and three losses (Houston, North Texas, and Western Kentucky).

CFP top 25 standings and bowl games
 
 
On December 20, 2020, the College Football Playoff selection committee announced its final team rankings for the year.

This was the seventh year of the College Football Playoff era.  Of the 28 playoff spots awarded during that time, 22 went to Alabama (6), Clemson (6), Ohio State (4), Oklahoma (4), and Notre Dame (2).

Conference champions' bowl games
Ranks are per the final CFP rankings, released on December 20, with win–loss records at that time. Two bowls featured a matchup of conference champions—the Arizona Bowl and the Sugar Bowl. Champions of the Power Five conferences were assured of a spot in a New Year's Six bowl game.

 The Sun Belt Championship Game was canceled due to COVID-19 issues, resulting in co-champions being declared.

Television ratings
All times Eastern.
CFP Rankings.

Most watched non-CFP bowl games

College Football Playoff

Notes

References

Further reading

 

NCAA football bowl games